Shenandoah Land and Improvement Company Office, also known as Stevens Cottage, is a historic office building located at Shenandoah, Page County, Virginia. It was built in 1891, as an office for the Shenandoah Land and Improvement Company.  It is a 1 1/2-story, Shingle Style cottage with a projecting front gable, a deeply recessed porch, and inset rectangular stucco panels resembling half-timbering.

It was listed on the National Register of Historic Places in 1976.  It is included as a contributing property in the Shenandoah Historic District.

References

Commercial buildings on the National Register of Historic Places in Virginia
Shingle Style architecture in Virginia
Commercial buildings completed in 1891
Buildings and structures in Page County, Virginia
National Register of Historic Places in Page County, Virginia
Individually listed contributing properties to historic districts on the National Register in Virginia